Henri Stierlin (2 April 1928 – 10 September 2022) was a Swiss journalist and writer of popular works on art and architectural history.

Education
Stierlin was born in Alexandria, Egypt. He studied Classics with Law at the Universities of Lausanne and Zurich. He achieved Bachelor of Arts (Law) whilst at Lausanne in 1954. He also studied Theory of Art History, at Grenoble University in 1977–1978, writing a dissertation on the Symbolic Nature of the Persian Mosque.

Journalistic career
Stierlin was a columnist in art-history, and editor at the Swiss newspaper Tribune de Geneve from 1955 to 1962, and a radio journalist at Radio Suisse in 1957 (cultural programs.) An editor for Rizzoli. In 1963 he became general editor of the Swiss magazine Radio-TV and architectural editor of the journal Werk-Œuvre in 1972.  He was made a Knight of the Legion of Honour in 2004.

Books and publications
Living architecture: ancient Mexican (1968)  192 pages
Encyclopaedia of world architecture volume 2 (1978)  499 pages
 The pre- civilizations: the world of the Maya, Aztecs, and Incas (1979)   95 pages
Art of the Maya : from the Olmecs to the Toltec-Maya (1981)  211 pages
 Art of the Aztecs (1982) 36 pages
 The cultural history of pre-Columbian America (1984)
Art of the Incas and its origins (1984)  240 pages
 Ma'yan (1994)  192 pages
Angkor and Khmer art (1997)  96 pages
The art of Islam in the East, from Isfahan to the Taj Mahal, Grund, Paris, 2002.
L'architecture de l'Islam : Au service de la foi et du pouvoir, coll. « Découvertes Gallimard » (nº 443), série Arts. Paris: Gallimard, 2003 Deus ex Machina, Infolio, Gollion, 2004
The Roman Empire: from the Etruscans to the decline of the Roman Empire (2004) 240 pages
The art of Mediterranean Islam, from Damascus to Cordoba, Grund, Paris, 2005
The photographic vision of architecture: An itinerary in the image, Infolio, Gollion, 2005. 128p. Splendors of the Persian Empire, Grund, Paris, 2006.
The Gold of the Pharaohs  (2007) 235 pages
The Pharaohs master builders (2008)  255 pages
Greece : from Mycenae to the Parthenon (2009) 224 pages
Le buste de Néfertiti : Une imposture de l'égyptologie?, Infolio, Gollion, 2009
Teotihuacán : La cité des Dieux, coll. « Découvertes Gallimard Hors série », 2009
Rituals and mysteries of the deified kings (2010)  224 pages

with Anne Stierlin

Splendour of an Islam World (1997) 219 pages
 Hindu India: from Khajuraho to the temple city of Madurai  (1998) 237 pages
Turkey: from the Selçuks to the Ottomans  (1998)  237 pages
Islamic art and architecture (2002)  319 pages

Joint

 Pedro Ramirez Vasquez  - Living architecture: Mayan (1964) 192 pages
 Hiroshi Daifuku,  Philipe Stern,  Ta-kuan Chou,  Madeleine Giteau, Son Soubert,  Luc Ionesco - S.O.S. Angkor  (1971)  42 pages
 Karl Gerstner  - The Spirit of colors: the art of Karl Gerstner : nine picture chapters and selected essays  (1981)  225 pages
Octavio Autpaz; Iris Barry; Daniele Lavallee; Jean Paul Barbier; Conceicao, G. Correa (2000)  -  Pre-Columbian America: Ritual Arts of the New World Henri Stierlin;

See also
Persepolis
Achaemenid
Islamic Art
Sassanid architecture

References

External links
 

1928 births
2022 deaths
Swiss art historians
Swiss newspaper editors
Swiss columnists
Swiss expatriates in Egypt
Swiss expatriates in France
University of Lausanne alumni
University of Zurich alumni
Chevaliers of the Légion d'honneur
People from Alexandria